Susan Hanket Brandt is an American historian. The author of Woman Healers: Gender, Authority, and Medicine in Early Philadelphia (2022), she is a lecturer at University of Colorado, Colorado Springs.

Biography
Susan Brandt received her undergraduate degree from Duke University, and then a Ph.D. from Temple University, in history. Her dissertation on women healers, Gifted Women and Skilled Practitioners: Gender and Healing Authority in the Delaware Valley, 1740–1830, won her the Lerner-Scott prize, awarded by the Organization of American Historians, in 2016.

Brandt's monograph Woman Healers: Gender, Authority, and Medicine in Early Philadelphia was published by the University of Pennsylvania Press in 2022. The book investigates the contributions by women healers to healthcare in the greater Philadelphia area; for centuries, European, Native American, and African American women provided healthcare, though their work has largely gone unnoticed.

References

Living people
Duke University people
Temple University alumni
American women historians
21st-century American historians
University of Colorado Colorado Springs faculty
Year of birth missing (living people)